Preventive nutrition is a branch of nutrition science with the goal of preventing or delaying or reducing the impacts of disease and disease-related complications. It is concerned with a high level of personal well-being, disease prevention, and diagnosis of recurring health problems or symptoms of discomfort which are often precursors to health issues. Preventive nutrition may assist in prolonging the onset of non-communicable diseases (such as Type 2 diabetes or cardiovascular disease) and may allow adults to experience more "healthy living years" later in life. The need for preventive nutrition continues to grow as the overweight and obese population numbers steadily rise within the childhood to adult populous, as the numbers have increased over the last 40 years. To educate the public about preventive nutrition, each social structure has its own way to communicate what preventive nutrition is  within its own society, this is done through either  a public health forum, government programs and policies or nutritional education. In the United States, preventive nutrition is taught to the public through the use of the food pyramid or MyPlate initiatives.

History 
The idea of using preventive nutrition as a medical treatment is not a new idea, as philosopher Hippocrates (460-377 BC) states that the best way to diminish diseases or ailments was to "Let food be your medicine and medicine be your food". Since the understanding for preventive nutrition was needed, the Mediterranean Diet model was the standard reference guide. As the Mediterranean diet was initially recognized to fight against the onset of heart disease.

Since the early 1980s food trends have gradually begun to change, with the introduction and fast popularization of processed prepackaged convenience foods. With this popularization these type of foods also increased the digestions of high amounts of sugar, sodium and high fatty foods which have a lower nutrient-density value that can have great adverse effects on health.

Benefits of Preventive Nutrition 
There are endless benefits to eating healthy, and everybody knows this.  According to a survey done in China on the hypertensive population, obesity was a leading cause of hypertension.  According to the article, "Hypertension is a major public health challenge in China. The prevalence of hypertension awareness, treatment, and control are still low despite existing public health policies and programs to reduce the burden of hypertension," [3].  Of the 3579 participants with hypertension, those with obesity were less likely to have their hypertension under control [3].  Preventive nutrition exists for this exact purpose.  It is necessary to prevent people from becoming overweight or out of shape before they fall victim to the side effects of obesity, injury, or other things associated with bad diets including anxiety and depression.  For example, a heavily Mediterranean diet for one year has been proven to provide senior citizens with better health than their previous diets [4].  The group of seniors was put on the Mediterranean diet for one year, and it was shown that the bacteria in the gut was far more diverse after the year on the diet.  In addition to this, the elders showed decreased signs of frailty, including hand strength, walking speed, and cognitive function.  This is because "The more diverse microbiota in the intervention group produced more short-chain fatty acids that have been associated with better health," [4].  The benefits of preventive nutrition, and nutrition overall extend far beyond just this, as nutrition can impact every individual and/or group in much different ways.

Athletics 
Athletes are held to a higher standard of nutrition, and preventive nutrition can be the key to many athletes staying on the field in the first place.  According to a study done by the National Collegiate Athletic Association, most athletes don’t even have a grasp on their nutrition, and neither do their coaches.  The study involved 579 participants, 185 athletes, 131 coaches, 192 athletic trainers (ATs), and 71 strength and conditioning specialists (SCSs).  A test was taken on their nutritional knowledge, and it was found that athletes and coaches in general do not know a lot about nutrition, with only 9% of athletes passing, and 35.9% of coaches.  For comparison, 71.4% of ATs, and 83.1% of SCSs passed the same knowledge test [1].  For something so crucial to performance, athletes in general do not know much at all about nutrition, and how it can affect their performance.  Not only does this affect their performance, but it also affects if they are even on the field or not, as preventive nutrition is a field for the purpose of finding out how to prevent things such as injury.  To demonstrate this, a group of high-performance runners (n=8) completed a fat adaptation carbohydrate restoration (FACR) dietary intervention (five days’ carbohydrate < 20% and fat > 60% energy, plus one-day carbohydrate ≥ 70% energy), and a control high-carbohydrate (HCHO) diet for six days (carbohydrate > 60% energy; fat < 20% energy) [2].  It was found that, compared to the HCHO diet, the FACR diet improved running economy, which is the efficiency which the athlete’s body uses energy while running, ultimately leading to a faster run time [4].  Although this is a very specific diet, it shows how changing the food one is eating can quickly improve athletic performance on the field (or track) as well.

Overlooked aspects 
Even though everyone knows (for the most part) which foods are healthy, and which foods are not, there is still an obesity problem in many countries around the world.  The idea of preventive nutrition is widely known and accepted, but people still do not follow the necessary dietary guidelines to a healthy lifestyle.  According to Kovacs, "one solution to address health concerns is to shift current dietary patterns to diets that are both nutritious and sustainable" [5].  Having a sustainable diet is the reason many people do not eat healthy; they are always on the road and eat McDonald’s far too often.  Or, another dilemma, is that people do not have enough money to eat healthy.  This is a huge problem, as "the poorest who face disproportionate barriers to accessing healthy food have an increased risk of malnutrition," [6].  People in cities often have more access to food easier than those in suburban areas, however people who are extremely poor do not have access to food at all.  This wedge driving through the poor and middle class is only making the gap larger, and with increased urbanization this will only lead to fewer people having access to healthy food [6].  However, people who are not considered to be in the poorest class, but do not have enough money to eat healthy food all the time have one simple solution.  Grocery stores.  Going to the grocery store and buying a lot of healthy food in bulk will end up being less expensive than buying fast food every day.  This is a huge loophole which many people do not take advantage of because they are too busy or do not want to cook.  This is the largest factor overlooked by many and needs to be taken advantage of much more than it currently is today.

Future of Preventive Nutrition & Conclusion 
Preventive nutrition is still in the very early stages of research, as people are just starting to take note of high-level athletes such as Tom Brady who is still an elite athlete at 43 years old.  And all due to his impeccable diet for the past 20 years or so. Overall, the "diets on metabolic responses and exercise performance in endurance athletes have not been conclusively determined" [1].  In other words, there really isn't enough evidence yet on what specific diets will best benefit which groups of people, but what there is evidence of is that a healthy diet can mean everything when it comes to getting on the field, court, or track, and staying on it.  The future of preventive nutrition looks very bright, and it can only get better from here.

See also 

Preventive healthcare
Dietitian is an expert in Dietetics and specializes in human nutrition.
Animal nutritionist specializes in animal nutrition
Physical activity
Hippocrates 
The Food Pyramid 
Mediterranean Diet and Mediterranean Diet Pyramid 
Non-communicable diseases

References

External links
Preventive Nutrition and Food Science
Biomedicine & Preventive Nutrition
MyPlate

Prevention
Nutrition by type
Nutritional science
Medical terminology